Eston Kaonga (born 22 February 1948) is a Malawian sprinter. He competed in the men's 200 metres at the 1972 Summer Olympics.

References

1948 births
Living people
Athletes (track and field) at the 1972 Summer Olympics
Malawian male sprinters
Olympic athletes of Malawi
Athletes (track and field) at the 1974 British Commonwealth Games
Commonwealth Games competitors for Malawi
Place of birth missing (living people)